Davide Petermann (born 25 December 1994) is an Italian footballer who plays as a midfielder for  club Foggia.

Career
On 8 August 2018, he signed a two-year contract with Reggina.

On 31 January 2019, he joined Pistoiese on loan.

On 20 August 2020 he signed a 2-year contract with Cesena. 

On 14 July 2021 he moved to Foggia on a two-year contract.

References

1994 births
Living people
Footballers from Rome
Italian footballers
Association football midfielders
Serie C players
Palermo F.C. players
F.C. Südtirol players
S.E.F. Torres 1903 players
Santarcangelo Calcio players
S.S. Teramo Calcio players
Carrarese Calcio players
A.S.D. Sicula Leonzio players
Reggina 1914 players
U.S. Pistoiese 1921 players
U.S. Vibonese Calcio players
Cesena F.C. players
Calcio Foggia 1920 players